A list of notable Democracy is Freedom – The Daisy politicians of Italy:

A
Lorenzo Acquarone
Alfonso Andria

B
Giovanni Bianchi
Enzo Bianco
Gerardo Bianco
Rosy Bindi
Paola Binetti
Carlo Bo
Guido Bodrato
Willer Bordon

C
Massimo Cacciari
Salvatore Cardinale
Pierluigi Castagnetti
Luigi Cocilovo
Tommaso Coletti

D
Luciano D'Alfonso
Sergio D'Antoni
Pier Giorgio Dall'Acqua
Ciriaco De Mita
Lorenzo Dellai
Graziano Delrio
Bruno Dettori
Lamberto Dini

F
Giuseppe Fioroni
Domenico Fisichella
Maurizio Fistarol
Marco Formentini
Aniello Formisano
Francesco Fortugno
Dario Franceschini

G
Paolo Gentiloni
Roberto Giachetti
Paolo Giaretta

I
Rosa Russo Iervolino

L
Linda Lanzillotta
Enrico Letta
Andrea Losco

M
Antonio Maccanico
Enrico Manca
Nicola Mancino
Franco Marini
Sergio Mattarella
Alessia Mosca

O
Leoluca Orlando

P
Arturo Parisi
Pina Picierno
Lapo Pistelli
Giovanni Procacci
Romano Prodi
Vittorio Prodi

R
Matteo Renzi
Sergio Reolon
Gianni Rivera
Ettore Rosato
Francesco Rutelli

S
Giulio Santagata
Gian Mario Spacca
Gianluca Susta

T
Patrizia Toia

V
Achille Variati
Donato Veraldi
Gianni Vernetti

Z
Valerio Zanone

Democracy is Freedom